Srećko Štiglić (11 June 1943 – 10 September 2020) was a Croatian hammer thrower who competed for SFR Yugoslavia in the 1972 Summer Olympics. Štiglić's personal best was 70.10 m, set in 1981.

References

1943 births
2020 deaths
Sportspeople from Zagreb
Croatian male hammer throwers
Yugoslav male hammer throwers
Olympic athletes of Yugoslavia
Athletes (track and field) at the 1972 Summer Olympics
Mediterranean Games gold medalists for Yugoslavia
Mediterranean Games medalists in athletics
Athletes (track and field) at the 1975 Mediterranean Games